Erich Bielka or Erich Bielka-Karltreu (born Ritter Bielka von Karltreu, 15 May 1908, Vienna, Austria - 1 September 1992, Bad Aussee, Styria) was an Austrian diplomat and member of the Austrian government. During his career, he served as Austrian ambassador in Bern, Cairo, Ankara and Paris and as Foreign Minister from 1974 to 1976.

Honours and awards
 Grand Gold Decoration for Services to the Republic of Austria (1965)
 Great Silver Medal for Services to the Republic of Austria (1974)
 Grand Officer of the Legion of Honour
 Decoration for Services to the Liberation of Austria

References

1908 births
1992 deaths
Politicians from Vienna
Ambassadors of Austria to Switzerland
Ambassadors of Austria to Egypt
Ambassadors of Austria to Turkey
Ambassadors of Austria to France
Austrian knights
Recipients of the Grand Decoration for Services to the Republic of Austria
Grand Officiers of the Légion d'honneur
Recipients of the Decoration for Services to the Liberation of Austria
Foreign ministers of Austria